Ras Shiloh (born Thomas Williams; January 6, 1975 in Brooklyn, United States) is a reggae artist who made From Rasta to you in 2002 and Only King Selassie I in 2007 concerning Haile Selassie I of Ethiopia the God reincarnate or the king by holy appointment of the Rastafari movement. His tenor vocals have been compared to the late Garnett Silk.

Discography
Chants (1997), Melchezidek - Ras Shiloh & Idrens
Babylon You Doom (1998), Shiloh B
Listen Well (1999), Who Dun It
From Rasta To You (2002), VP
Coming Home (2007), VP
Only King Selassie (2007), Greensleeves
Humanity EP (2012), Flava McGregor Records

References

Living people
Musicians from Brooklyn
1975 births
Performers of Rastafarian music
American Rastafarians
VP Records artists